Polish 1st Legions Infantry Division is a tactical unit of the Polish Army. Formed on February 20, 1919, partially of veterans of the I Brigade of the Polish Legions, the unit saw extensive action during the Polish-Bolshevik War and World War II. Regarded by the soldiers of the Wehrmacht as the Iron Division, it distinguished itself in the Invasion of Poland.

As one of the most experienced and best equipped Polish divisions, it fought in many of the most notable battles of the Polish-Bolshevik War of 1919 and 1920. Among them was the operation of liberation of Wilno and Battle of Dyneburg in Daugavpils, Latvia (as part of Rydz-Śmigły's Third Army and under his personal command, although the actual commanding officer was Michał Karaszewicz-Tokarzewski). During the Kiev Offensive of spring of 1920, the division formed the core of  Operational Group and took part in the battle of Zhytomyr (April 25), capturing the city of Kiev itself (May 7). After the Polish withdrawal, the unit took part in heavy retreat battles and shielded the retreat of the rest of the Polish forces. After several clashes with the 1st Cavalry Army, the division broke off and reached the area of the Wieprz River, from where it started the counter-offensive during the Battle of Warsaw (see Battle of Dęblin and Mińsk Mazowiecki). On the second day of the Polish offensive, August 16, the division managed to outflank the Bolshevik Mozyr Group by a forced march of over 56 kilometres. After that the division, commanded by Stefan Dąb-Biernacki, was attached to the Second Army and took part in the second biggest battle of the war, the Battle of the Niemen River. During the battle, the unit formed the core of the Wilno Group and took part in a successful outflanking manoeuvre of the Bolshevik forces centered on the city of Grodno.

After that the division was moved to the rear and took part in shielding the border with Lithuania during Lucjan Żeligowski's forming of the Central Lithuanian Republic (see Żeligowski's Mutiny). After the war, the division was partially demobilized and stationed in Wilno as an en cadre divisional core. In the Second Polish Republic, the division consisted of three infantry regiments (1st, 5th, and 6th; all garrisoned in Wilno), and other units, such as light and heavy artillery regiments, a company of cyclists, military engineers, and a mounted squadron.

Before the outbreak of World War II, the division, commanded by General Wincenty Kowalski, was partially mobilized in March 1939. As a part of the Wyszków Operational Group it was to shield the northern approaches of Warsaw from the German assault from East Prussia. After the outbreak of the Polish Defensive War, the division became fully mobilized and on September 4, 1939, it made contact with enemy troops in the forests around Długosiodło. On September 7 it took part in heavy fighting near Pułtusk, but was outnumbered 3 to 1 and ordered to retreat southwards to defend the Bug River line between Kamieńczyk and Wyszków. Reinforced by 98th Heavy Artillery Detachment and 61st Light Artillery Detachment, the division successfully repelled a German assault near Brańszczyk, after which it began delaying actions while retreating towards Kałuszyn. On September 11 that town was seized by German units and had to be retaken by force during heavy street fighting in the dark.

From there, General Wincenty Kowalski planned a counter-assault of his division. In what became known as the Battle of Kałuszyn, on September 13, the division started an all-out assault on German positions in nearby villages. After heavy fighting, the division broke through the third line of German defences in the villages of Lipiny, Debowiec, Wola Wodyńska, and Oleśnica. It finally broke through the German lines at Jagodno, but also suffered heavy casualties and lost most of its artillery and logistical support. Dispersed units crossed the German lines and joined several different Polish units, some of them formed ad hoc. The biggest group was rallied by the division commander but now numbered only three infantry companies out of an original three regiments. These troops broke through the forests near Radzyń Podlaski to reach the units of Gen. Stefan Dąb-Biernacki and on September 22 took part in the successful Battle of Falków against parts of the German 8th Infantry Division. Shortly afterward the division effectively ceased to exist.

As a reaction to the Russian Invasion of Ukraine of 2022, the Polish Ministry of National Defense decided to revive the unit. On 9 January 2023 Minister of National Defense Mariusz Błaszczak announced that the 1st Legions Infantry Division will be revived as an addition to the 16th Mechanized Division, stationed in Warmia-Masuria and 18th Mechanized Division, stationed in Masovia. The 1DPLeg will be the 5th mechanized division of the Polish Armed Forces.
The headquarters of the revived 1DPLeg will be in Ciechanów

Order Of Battle
 Polish 1st Legions Infantry Regiment – Col. Kazimierz Burczak
 Polish 5th Legions Infantry Regiment – Lt.Col. Kazimierz Bąbiński
 Polish 6th Legions Infantry Regiment – Col. Stanisław Engel
 Polish 1st Legions Light Artillery Regiment – Lt. Col. Mieczysław Podlewski
 1st Heavy Artillery Detachment – Maj. Władysław Świderski
 1st Battalion of Engineers – Capt. Tadeusz Wejtko
 1st Motorized AA Battery – 1st Lieut. Stefan Osostowicz
 Telephone company – Capt. Mika (?)
 Organic cavalry squadron – Maj. Bronisław Kulik
 31st company of taczanka HMG – 1st Lieut. Stanisław Kasprzyk
 31st Bicycle company – 1st Lieut. Jerzy Niemcewicz
 tabors and services

See also
 Polish army order of battle in 1939
 Polish contribution to World War II
 List of Polish divisions in World War II

References

Seidner, Stanley S. Marshal Edward Śmigły-Rydz Rydz and the Defense of Poland, New York, 1978.
Lech Wyszczelski: Wojsko Polskie w latach 1918-1921. Warszawa: Wydawnictwo Neriton, 2006
Zdzisław Jagiełło: Piechota Wojska Polskiego 1918-1939. Warszawa: Bellona, 2007

01st Legions
Military units and formations established in 1919
1st Legions
1st Legions
Military units and formations disestablished in 1944